Indian Paintings is a historic archaeological site located near Maiden Spring, Tazewell County, Virginia. These pictographs are on a rock face high on Paint Lick Mountain. Stretched in a horizontal line along the irregular exposure is a series of simple images representing thunderbirds, human figures, deer, arrows, trees, and the sun, all painted in a red medium using iron oxide.

It was listed on the National Register of Historic Places in 1969.

References

External links
Image of one pictograph

Archaeological sites on the National Register of Historic Places in Virginia
National Register of Historic Places in Tazewell County, Virginia
Rock art in North America